Christian Alberto López Bobadilla (30 March 1984 – 6 November 2013) was a Guatemalan weightlifter. He competed in the -105kg event at the 2008 Summer Olympics and the +105 kg at the 2012 Summer Olympics. At the 2010 Central American and Caribbean Games, López won a gold medal in the +105 kg snatch and a bronze in the +105 kg combined.

López died on 6 November 2013 from pneumonia.

References

1984 births
2013 deaths
Guatemalan male weightlifters
Olympic weightlifters of Guatemala
Weightlifters at the 2008 Summer Olympics
Weightlifters at the 2012 Summer Olympics
Deaths from pneumonia in Guatemala
People from Quetzaltenango Department
Pan American Games competitors for Guatemala
Weightlifters at the 2007 Pan American Games
Weightlifters at the 2011 Pan American Games
Central American and Caribbean Games gold medalists for Guatemala
Central American and Caribbean Games bronze medalists for Guatemala
Competitors at the 2010 Central American and Caribbean Games
Central American and Caribbean Games medalists in weightlifting
21st-century Guatemalan people